The Amutara River is a river of Bolivia in the La Paz Department.

See also
List of rivers of Bolivia
 Sacambaya River

References

Rand McNally, The New International Atlas, 1993.

Rivers of La Paz Department (Bolivia)